Declan O'Loan (born 5 August 1951) is an Irish former politician who served as a   Member of the Northern Ireland Assembly (MLA) for North Antrim from 2007 to 2011. O’Loan was previously a  member of Ballymena Borough Council. He is a member of the Social Democratic and Labour Party (SDLP), but the party whip was withdrawn on 25 May 2010.

O'Loan was elected for the SDLP in the 2007 Assembly Elections. He was suspended by the SDLP after advocating a merger between the SDLP and Sinn Féin to form a single nationalist party. The SDLP had refused to make an electoral pact with Sinn Féin in the 2010 Westminster election. In the May 2011 election, O'Loan ran as an SDLP candidate for re-election to the Assembly from North Antrim, but was eliminated in the last round of ballot-counting.

Declan O'Loan is married to Nuala O'Loan, a former Police Ombudsman for Northern Ireland.  He is also the Honorary Consul of Romania in Northern Ireland. O'Loan studied at Imperial College London and Fitzwilliam College, Cambridge.

Organisational membership
Secretary of the Association of SDLP Councillors
Chair of Ballymena District Policing Partnership
Chair of Ballymena Community Safety Partnership
Member of the Board of Ballymena Citizens Advice Bureau
Member of the Board of Ballymena Community Forum
Member of the Ballymena Local Strategy Partnership
Member of the Northern Ireland Community Relations Council

References

External links
 Official website

1951 births
Living people
Alumni of Fitzwilliam College, Cambridge
Alumni of Imperial College London
Members of Ballymena Borough Council
Social Democratic and Labour Party MLAs
Northern Ireland MLAs 2007–2011
People from Ballymena
Politicians from County Antrim
Spouses of life peers